Khnkoyan is a village in the Lori Province of Armenia. It is located on the banks of the Pambak River, near its source, 48 km southwest of the provincial capital of Vanadzor. Known as Gharaboya until 1946, it was renamed in honor of its most famous native, the children's author Atabek Khnkoyan (Khnko Aper), whose house museum is located in the village.

The village was founded by Armenian migrants from the regions of Basen, Mush and Kars in 1827–1828 and originally named Hatik. Its main economic activities are cattle breeding and cultivation of grain, fodder crops, beets and fruits. As of 1980, there were quarries producing construction materials in the village. It has a school, a club, a library, and a nursery-kindergarten. It has a temperate climate, with mild summers (maximum temperature 27 °C) and long, frosty winters lasting about 5 months.

Population

References 

Populated places in Lori Province